Eric M. Bromwell (born December 12, 1976) is an American politician from Maryland and a member of the Democratic Party. Bromwell represented district 8 in the Maryland House of Delegates from January 2003 to September 2019. In September 2019 he resigned from the Maryland House of Delegates to serve as opioid strategy coordinator for Baltimore County Executive Johnny Olszewski.

Birth
Eric Bromwell was born in Baltimore, Maryland on December 12, 1976.

Education
Eric Bromwell received his education from the following institutions:
Graduate Studies, University of Baltimore, 2000–present
BA, English, Salisbury University, 1998

Caucuses/Non-Legislative Committees
Eric Bromwell has been a member of the following committees:
Member, Maryland Veterans Caucus, 2005–present
Member, Maryland Legislative Sportsmens Caucus, 2003–present
Chair, Baltimore County Delegation, 2007-2010
Member, Joint Committee on the Selection of the State Treasurer, 2007
Member, Joint Legislative Task Force on Universal Access to Quality and Affordable Health Care, 2005-2007
Member, Maryland Medicaid Advisory Committee, 2004-2009

Organizations
Eric Bromwell has been a member of the following organizations:
Member, The Grunwald Club, 2009–present
Member, Charles H. Hickey, Jr., School Advisory Board, 2005–present
Member, Maryland Historical Society, 2005–present
Member, Linwood Center Advisory Board, 2004–present
President, Minte Home Owners Association, 2003–present
Co-Chair, Allied Community Services, 2002–present
Member, Baltimore County Civic and Social Club
Member, Baltimore County Young Democrats
Member, Parkville Jaycees
Member, Perry Hall Middle School Parent-Teacher Association
Board of Governors Member, Sixth District Democratic Club

Background
Bromwell was born in Baltimore and raised Catholic. He attended Calvert Hall College High School and Salisbury University and worked in various capacities for the media corporation Comcast both before and after being elected to office.

In the legislature
As of 2008, Bromwell is serving in his 2nd term in the Maryland House of Delegates, representing Maryland's District 8 in Baltimore County. Bromwell is a member of the Health and Government Operations Committee. In 2007 he was Elected Chairman of the Baltimore County Delegation.

Legislative notes
 voted for the Clean Indoor Air Act of 2007 (HB359)
 voted against in-state tuition for illegal immigrants in 2007 (HB6)

Election results
2010 Race for Maryland House of Delegates – District 08
Voters to choose three:
{| class="wikitable"
|-
!Name
!Votes
!Percent
!Outcome
|-
|-
|Joseph C. Boteler III
|21,427
|  19.49%
|   Won
|-
|-
|John Cluster
|19,237
|  17.5%
|   Won
|-
|-
|Eric M. Bromwell
|18,966
|  17.25%
|   Won
|-
|-
|Ruth Baisden
|18,223
|  16.57%
|   Lost
|-
|-
|Norman Secoura
|16,267
|  14.79%
|   Lost
|-
|-
|Cal Bowman
|15,757
|  14.33%
|   Lost
|-
|Other Write-Ins
|      80
|      0.1%
|   Lost
|-
|}

2006 Race for Maryland House of Delegates – District 08
Voters to choose three:
{| class="wikitable"
|-
!Name
!Votes
!Percent
!Outcome
|-
|-
|Eric M. Bromwell
|20,116
|  17.9%
|   Won
|-
|-
|Joseph C. Boteler III
|19,586
|  17.4%
|   Won
|-
|-
|Todd Schuler
|18,356
|  16.3%
|   Won
|-
|-
|Ruth Baisden
|18,261
|  16.2%
|   Lost
|-
|-
|Melissa Redmer Mullahey
|18,160
|  16.1%
|   Lost
|-
|-
|John W. E. Cluster Jr.
|18,057
|  16.0%
|   Lost
|-
|Other Write-Ins
|      74
|     0.1%
|   Lost
|-
|}

2002 Race for Maryland House of Delegates – District 08
Voters to choose three:
{| class="wikitable"
|-
!Name
!Votes
!Percent
!Outcome
|-
|-
|Alfred W. Redmer Jr.
|22,884
|  19.61%
|   Won
|-
|-
|Eric M. Bromwell
|20,314
|  17.41%
|   Won
|-
|-
|Joseph C. Boteler III
|19,826
|  16.99%
|   Won
|-
|-
|Mike Rupp
|18,755
|  16.07%
|   Lost
|-
|-
|Tim Caslin
|18,553
|  15.90%
|   Lost
|-
|-
|Todd Schuler
|16,277
|  13.95%
|   Lost
|-
|Other Write-Ins
|      86
|     0.07%
|   Lost
|-
|}

References

External links
 
 
 

Democratic Party members of the Maryland House of Delegates
Salisbury University alumni
Politicians from Baltimore
1976 births
Living people
21st-century American politicians
Calvert Hall College High School alumni